Azadkhani (also Romanized as Āzādkhānī; also known as Āzādī) is a village in Robat Rural District, in the Central District of Khorramabad County, Lorestan Province, Iran. At the 2006 census, its population was 49, in 10 families.

References 

Towns and villages in Khorramabad County